Tectiphiala ferox, or palmiste bouglé, is a species of flowering plant in the family Arecaceae. It is endemic to Mauritius.

It is threatened by habitat loss. It is the sole species in the genus Tectiphiala. Tectiphiala ferox was not known until 1965 when this new species of the Mascarene palm was discovered near Grand Bassin by Marc d"Unienville.

Individuals in this species can grow up to 9 meters. The cytology of this species has not been studied.

References

Endemic flora of Mauritius
Monotypic Arecaceae genera
Oncospermatinae
Critically endangered flora of Africa
Taxonomy articles created by Polbot